The 2022 Players Championship was the 49th Players Championship, held March 10–14 at TPC Sawgrass in Ponte Vedra Beach, Florida. It was the 41st edition at the Stadium Course and concluded on Monday due to weather delays. The purse was increased by a third this year to twenty million dollars.

Cameron Smith shot a six-under-par 66 in the final round to finish at 275 (–13) to win his first Players Championship, one stroke ahead of runner-up Anirban Lahiri, the 54-hole leader. Defending champion Justin Thomas finished ten strokes back, tied for 33rd place.

Venue

Course layout

Source:

Field
The field consisted of 144 players meeting various criteria; they include tournament winners on the PGA Tour since the previous Players Championship, recent winners of major championships, The Players and World Golf Championships, and leading players in the FedEx Cup standings from the current and preceding seasons.

Eligibility criteria
This list details the eligibility criteria for the 2022 Players Championship and the players who qualified under them; any additional criteria under which players were eligible is indicated in parentheses.

1. Winners of PGA Tour events since the 2021 Players Championship

Abraham Ancer (10,16,18)
Ryan Brehm
Sam Burns (16,18,21)
Patrick Cantlay (7,13,16,18)
Cameron Champ (16)
Stewart Cink (16)
Joel Dahmen (16)
Cameron Davis (16)
Tony Finau (16,18)
Lucas Glover (16)
Talor Gooch (16,18,21)
Lucas Herbert
Garrick Higgo (16)
Tom Hoge (16,18,21)
Max Homa (14,16,18)
Billy Horschel (9,16,18)
Viktor Hovland (16,18)
Im Sung-jae (16,18,21)
Matt Jones (16)
Kevin Kisner (9,16,18)
Jason Kokrak (16,18)
Lee Kyoung-hoon (16)
Marc Leishman (16,18)
Luke List (16,21)
Rory McIlroy (7,11,16,18)
Collin Morikawa (5,6,8,16,18,21)
Joaquín Niemann (14,16,18,21)
Séamus Power (16,18)
Jon Rahm (4,13,16,18)
Scottie Scheffler (12,18,21)
Cameron Smith (16,18,21)
Jordan Spieth (16,18)
Sepp Straka (14,16)
Hudson Swafford (16)
Erik van Rooyen (16)

Hideki Matsuyama (2,16,18,21) did not play.

2. Recent winners of the Masters Tournament (2017–2021)

Sergio García (16,18)
Dustin Johnson (4,7,8,16,18)
Patrick Reed (8,16,18)Tiger Woods did not play.3. Recent winners of The Players Championship (2016–2021)

Jason Day (16)
Kim Si-woo (16)
Webb Simpson (16,18)
Justin Thomas (5,10,16,18)

4. Recent winners of the U.S. Open (2016–2021)

Brooks Koepka (5,10,16,18)
Gary Woodland (16)Bryson DeChambeau (12,13,16,18) did not play.5. Recent winners of the PGA Championship (2016–2021)

Jimmy WalkerPhil Mickelson (16,18) did not play.6. Recent winners of The Open Championship (2016–2021)

Shane Lowry (16,18)
Francesco Molinari (12)
Henrik Stenson

7. Recent winners of the FedEx Cup (2018/19–2020/21)

8. Recent winners of the WGC Championship (2019–2021)

9. Recent winners of the WGC Match Play (2018–2021)
Bubba Watson (16)

10. Recent winners of the WGC Invitational (2018–2021)

11. Recent winners of the WGC-HSBC Champions (2018–2019)

Xander Schauffele (15,16,18)

12. Recent winners of the Arnold Palmer Invitational (2019–2022)

Tyrrell Hatton (16,18)

13. Recent winners of the Memorial Tournament (2018–2021)

14. Recent winners of the Genesis Invitational (2020–2022)

Adam Scott (16,18)

15. Winner of the Olympic Golf Competition in 2021

16. Top 125 from the previous season's FedEx Cup points list

Daniel Berger (18)
Keegan Bradley
Paul Casey (18)
Wyndham Clark
Corey Conners (18)
Matt Fitzpatrick (18)
Dylan Frittelli
Brice Garnett
Brian Gay
Doug Ghim
Branden Grace
Lanto Griffin
Emiliano Grillo
Chesson Hadley
Adam Hadwin
Brandon Hagy
James Hahn
Brian Harman
Russell Henley (18)
Kramer Hickok
Harry Higgs
Charley Hoffman
Mackenzie Hughes
Zach Johnson
Chris Kirk
Patton Kizzire
Russell Knox
Matt Kuchar
Anirban Lahiri
Martin Laird
Hank Lebioda
Adam Long
Peter Malnati
Denny McCarthy
Maverick McNealy
Troy Merritt
Keith Mitchell
Sebastián Muñoz
Matthew NeSmith
Henrik Norlander
Alex Norén
Louis Oosthuizen (18)
Carlos Ortiz
Ryan Palmer
Pan Cheng-tsung
Pat Perez
Scott Piercy
J. T. Poston
Ian Poulter
Andrew Putnam
Chez Reavie
Doc Redman
Sam Ryder
Adam Schenk
Charl Schwartzel
Roger Sloan
Brandt Snedeker
Scott Stallings
Kyle Stanley
Brendan Steele
Robert Streb
Kevin Streelman
Brian Stuard
Brendon Todd
Cameron Tringale (18)
Harold Varner III (18)
Jhonattan Vegas
Matt Wallace
Richy Werenski
Lee Westwood (18)
Aaron Wise
Matthew Wolff (18)Harris English (18), Kevin Na (18) and Tyler McCumber did not play.17. The top 125 players who fulfilled the terms of a major medical extension

Danny Lee

18. Top 50 from the Official World Golf Ranking following The Honda Classic

Tommy Fleetwood
Thomas Pieters
Justin Rose
Will Zalatoris

19. Senior Players champion from previous yearSteve Stricker did not play due to illness.20. Leading points winners from the Korn Ferry Tour and Korn Ferry Tour Finals during the previous year

Joseph Bramlett
Stephan Jäger

21. Top 10 in the current season's FedEx Cup points standings after The Honda Classic

22. Remaining positions and alternates filled through current year FedEx Cup standings after The Honda Classic

Cameron Young (15)
Mito Pereira (34)
Sahith Theegala (42)
Nick Watney (43)
J. J. Spaun (47)
Kevin Tway (48)
Beau Hossler (53)
Lee Hodges (54)
Taylor Pendrith (61)
Hayden Buckley (62)
Taylor Moore (64)
Patrick Rodgers (66)
Michael Thompson (68)

Round summaries
First roundThursday, March 10, 2022Friday, March 11, 2022 Saturday, March 12, 2022Overnight rain delayed the start by an hour and further delays during the day meant that only 66 of the 144 players completed their opening round on Thursday, while 12 players did not start their rounds. Tommy Fleetwood and Tom Hoge were top of the leaderboard after opening rounds of 66, 6-under-par, when play was suspended due to darkness. Harold Varner III had earlier led at 7-under-par, but he made a triple-bogey 6 at the 17th hole and, after a bogey at the last, finished with 69. The first round resumed on Friday, but after another weather delay, the course was declared unplayable by Tour officials with 47 of the 144 players not having completed their opening round. Play resumed at noon on Saturday in windy conditions. The first round was completed in the early afternoon, 54 hours after it has started. Fleetwood and Hoge still led with six players a stroke behind.

Second roundSaturday, March 12, 2022Sunday, March 13, 2022The second round started at noon on Saturday, before the first round was completed. In windy conditions, less than half the field were able to complete their rounds and a number of groups did not start their rounds. 71 players made the cut at 146 (+2), when the second round was completed at about 3 pm on Sunday. The co-leaders were Sam Burns and Tom Hoge at 137, 7-under-par.

Third roundSunday, March 13, 2022Monday, March 14, 2022The third round started at 3:15 pm on Sunday using both the first and tenth tees.

Final roundMonday, March 14, 2022The final round started at 11:00 am using both the first and tenth tees.

ScorecardFinal roundCumulative tournament scores, relative to par''
{|class="wikitable" span = 50 style="font-size:85%;
|-
|style="background: Red;" width=10|
|Eagle
|style="background: Pink;" width=10|
|Birdie
|style="background: PaleGreen;" width=10|
|Bogey
|style="background: Green;" width=10|
|Double bogey
|}

Notes

References

External links

Official Media Guide

2022
2022 in golf
2022 in American sports
2022 in sports in Florida
March 2022 sports events in the United States